Foro Italico University of Rome, formerly known as the University Institute of Motor Sciences (IUSM) is a public research university located in Rome, Italy.

It is a vocational university, the only Italian state university dedicated to sports and movement sciences. It was created in 1998 when it replaced Rome's Istituto Superiore di Educazione Fisica (ISEF) whose activity had been centred on higher education for P.E. teachers. The university extended the institute's scope to cover all the fields of interest arising from Man's physical activity: scientific research, coaching for recreational sports and for high level competitive sports, teaching, fitness and rehabilitation, organization and management of sports events and facilities.

It offers a three-year course for a Bachelor of Arts in Sports Sciences, followed by a two-year graduate degree in either Preventive and Adapted Physical Activity or Management of Sports and Physical Activities.

The University "Foro Italico" also offers a two-year European master's degree in Preventive and Adapted Physical Activity organized in co-operation with the Universities of Cologne, Odense and Vienna, and a post-graduate programme for physical education teachers. A second European master's degree in Physical Activity for Children and Adolescents, organized in co-operation with the universities of Odense, Bristol and Clermont-Ferrand.

It is situated in the "Foro Italico" complex, a huge green area along the banks of the river Tiber at the foot of Monte Mario, Rome's highest hill covered with thick woods. The Foro Italico is the greatest Italian sports complex, including indoor and outdoor swimming-pools, gyms of many dimensions, tennis courts, two track-and-fields arenas and the big Olympic Stadium.

See also 
 List of Italian universities
 Roma Tre University
 Rome
 Sapienza University of Rome
 University of Rome Tor Vergata

External links
"Foro Italico" University of Rome Website

Universities in Italy
Educational institutions established in 1998
1998 establishments in Italy
Rome Q. XV Della Vittoria